Toneelgroep Amsterdam is the largest repertory company in the Netherlands. Its home base is the Amsterdam Stadsschouwburg, a classical 19th century theatre building in the heart of Amsterdam.

History

His montage-method of creating plays and his avant-garde stagings of classic plays were very influential in the Netherlands, as well as abroad. Since 2000 the company is led by Flemish director Ivo van Hove. He and his long-time designer Jan Versweyveld broke through the confinements of the classical stage to rediscover the stage as a "location." For their production Faces (an adaptation of John Cassavetes's film) the audience watched the show lying in beds.

International

Many of Toneelgroep Amsterdam's productions travel abroad.  For instance, van Hove's adaptation of several of Shakespeare's plays, presented under the title Roman Tragedies, was shown at the major European theatre festivals (Wiener Festwochen, Festival d'Avignon, Theaterformen). Opening Night, another adaptation of a Cassavetes film, was shown at the Brooklyn Academy of Music in New York in December 2008, and at Melbourne Festival in Australia in October 2010, which was van Hove's Australian debut. "Ivo van Hove's work has been groundbreaking in opening up  audiences' understanding of classic texts and films. His work is unique, raw, shocking, surprising, hilarious – everything you want theatre to be – and he doesn't shy away from the ugly or the profane. In a word, stunning, with a capital ‘S’." (Cate Blanchett)

Company
Director: Ivo van Hove
Ensemble: Hélène Devos, Jip van den Dool, Fred Goessens, Janni Goslinga, Aus Greidanus jr, Marieke Heebink, Robert de Hoog, Hans Kesting, Hugo Koolschijn, Maria Kraakman, Ramsey Nasr, Chris Nietvelt, Celia Nufaar, Frieda Pittoors, Halina Reijn, Gijs Scholten van Aschat, Harm Duco Schut, Bart Slegers en Eelco Smits.

Eric de Vroedt is an established guest director at Toneelgroep Amsterdam.

References

External links
Official website
Toneelgroep Amsterdam's YouTube-channel

1987 establishments in the Netherlands
Culture in Amsterdam
Organisations based in Amsterdam
Theatre companies in the Netherlands